Ittoqqortoormiit Municipality was one of the two municipalities of East Greenland. Since 1 January 2009 it has been incorporated into the Sermersooq municipality. It encompassed an area of 235,000 km2 (91,000 sq mi) along the Denmark Strait and the Greenland Sea. Before the creation of the Northeast Greenland National Park in 1974, the former municipality had been much bigger (935,000 km2), formally encompassing the largely uninhabited area to the north up to the border with Avannaa (North Greenland).

Population is 537 (as of 2005). Besides the main town of Ittoqqortoormiit, only one more populated village was located within the former municipality, Itterajivit, 14 km to the west across Rosenvinge Bugt, with a population of only 9 (as of 2005).

References
 Greenland and the Arctic. By Etain O'Carroll and Mark Elliott. Lonely Planet 2005. .
 Greenland in Figures 2005 Statistics Greenland. 3rd Edition, May 2005. ISSN 1604-7397
 Information pages on www.ittoqqortoormiit.gl http://www.ittoqqortoormiit.gl/uksider/english.htm]

External links
 Official site of Ittoqqortoormiit 

Former municipalities of Greenland